The Coalition of Ethiopian Democratic Forces (abbreviated COEDF) was a political coalition in Ethiopia, formed by former arch-rivals MEISON and the Ethiopian People's Revolutionary Party during the final phase of the Derg regime. Marsa Yosef (a key EPRP leader) served as the chairman of COEDF.

During the transitional period after the fall of the Derg, TPLF and EPRDF excluded COEDF from the Council of Representatives. Notably COEDF lacked any military force of its own as a means of pressure.

References

Defunct left-wing political party alliances
Defunct political party alliances in Ethiopia
Factions of the Ethiopian Civil War
Rebel groups in Ethiopia